Aarón Irízar López (born 28 February 1950) is a Mexican politician affiliated with the PRI. He currently serves as Senator of the LXII Legislature of the Mexican Congress representing Sinaloa. He also served as Deputy during two Legislatures, between 2000 and 2003 and between 2009 and 2012.

References

1950 births
Living people
Politicians from Sinaloa
Members of the Senate of the Republic (Mexico)
Members of the Chamber of Deputies (Mexico)
Institutional Revolutionary Party politicians
21st-century Mexican politicians
People from Guamúchil
Members of the Congress of Sinaloa
Autonomous University of Sinaloa alumni